St. Catharines station is a railway station in St. Catharines, Ontario, Canada. It is served by the Maple Leaf train between Toronto and New York City and is a stop on the Lakeshore West line of GO Transit. The station is a designated Heritage Railway Station.

History

The single level pavilion-style station was built and opened in 1917 by the Grand Trunk Railway and acquired by CN Rail in 1923 who used it for passenger service. Via Rail gained ownership in 1986 It is the third station to be built on the site, first in 1853 by Great Western Railway and then 1898 by Grand Trunk. It was renovated in 1988 and 1994, but neither changed the appearance of the structure.

The station was formerly staffed by Via Rail, but the ticket agent was replaced by an automated kiosk in October 2012. A similar station was also built in Berlin, New Hampshire around the same time in 1917.

Service
As of September 2021, GO Transit operates a single weekday round trip on the Lakeshore West commuter train service between Toronto and Niagara Falls. On weekends, four round trips operate between Toronto and Niagara Falls.

On weekdays, GO Transit bus route 18K connects St. Catharines station to Hamilton West Harbour, Hamilton Centre and  Aldershot stations.

Via Rail and Amtrak jointly operate a single daily round trip on the Maple Leaf train service between Toronto and New York City.

References

External links

St. Catharines Via Rail Station (at TrainWeb.org)

Amtrak stations in Canada
Buildings and structures in St. Catharines
Rail transport in St. Catharines
Via Rail stations in Ontario
GO Transit railway stations
Railway stations in Canada opened in 1917
Designated heritage railway stations in Ontario
1917 establishments in Ontario
Grand Trunk Railway stations in Ontario
Railway stations in the Regional Municipality of Niagara